Geonet may refer to:
 Geosynthetic, products used to solve civil engineering problems
 GEOnet Names Server, a database of place names used outside of the United States
 GeoNet, an early international on-line services network
 GeoNet, a geological hazards monitoring service in New Zealand run by GNS Science